Longville may refer to:

Places
 Longville, California, United States
 Longville, Louisiana, United States
 Longville, Minnesota, United States
Longville Municipal Airport, airport in Minnesota
 Longville, Missouri, United States
Longville in the Dale, village in Shropshire, England
Longville railway station, station at Longville in the Dale, England
Cheney Longville, village in Shropshire, England
Cheney Longville Castle, 14th-century manor house
Cheney Longville Formation, geological formation
Newton Longville, village in Buckinghamshire, England
Newton Longville railway station, proposed station on East West Rail line
Weston Longville, civil parish in Norfolk

People with the surname
John Longville (born 1949), American politician